Puerto Rico is scheduled to compete at the 2023 Pan American Games in Santiago, Chile from October 20 to November 5, 2023. This was Puerto Rico's 19th appearance at the Pan American Games, having competed at every Games since the inaugural edition in 1951.

Competitors
The following is the list of number of competitors (per gender) participating at the games per sport/discipline.

Archery

Puerto Rico qualified two archers during the 2022 Pan American Archery Championships.

Men

Basketball

5x5

Men's tournament

Puerto Rico qualified a men's team (of 12 athletes) by finishing sixth in the 2022 FIBA Americup.
Summary

3x3

Men's tournament

Puerto Rico qualified a men's team (of 4 athletes) by winning the 2021 Junior Pan American Games.
Summary

Bowling

Puerto Rico qualified a team of one man and three women.

Canoeing

Sprint
Puerto Rico qualified a total of 3 sprint athletes (three men).

Men

Fencing

Puerto Rico qualified three fencers (two men and one woman) through the 2022 Pan American Fencing Championships in Ascuncion, Paraguay.

Individual

Karate

Puerto Rico qualified a female karateka after winning one category during the 2021 Junior Pan American Games.

Kumite

Sailing

Puerto Rico has qualified 2 boats for a total of 3 sailors.

Men

Mixed

Shooting

Puerto Rico qualified a total of 14 shooters in the 2022 Americas Shooting Championships.

Men
Pistol and rifle

Men
Shotgun

Women
Pistol and rifle

Women
Shotgun

Softball

Puerto Rico qualified a women's team (of 18 athletes) by virtue of its campaign in the 2022 Pan American Championships.

Summary

Surfing

Puerto Rico qualified one female surfer.

Race

Weightlifting

Puerto Rico qualified six weightlifters (three per gender).

Wrestling

Puerto Rico qualified six wrestlers (Men's Freestyle: 57 kg, 65 kg, 74 kg, 86 kg and 125 kg), (Greco-Roman: 130 kg) through the 2022 Pan American Wrestling Championships held in Acapulco, Mexico.

Men

See also
Puerto Rico at the 2024 Summer Olympics

References

Nations at the 2023 Pan American Games
2019
P